The Enola Gay is a Boeing B-29 Superfortress bomber, named after Enola Gay Tibbets, the mother of the pilot, Colonel Paul Tibbets. On 6 August 1945, piloted by Tibbets and Robert A. Lewis during the final stages of World War II, it became the first aircraft to drop an atomic bomb in warfare. The bomb, code-named "Little Boy", was targeted at the city of Hiroshima, Japan, and caused the destruction of about three quarters of the city. Enola Gay participated in the second nuclear attack as the weather reconnaissance aircraft for the primary target of Kokura. Clouds and drifting smoke resulted in Nagasaki, a secondary target, being bombed instead.

After the war, the Enola Gay returned to the United States, where it was operated from Roswell Army Air Field, New Mexico. In May 1946, it was flown to Kwajalein for the Operation Crossroads nuclear tests in the Pacific, but was not chosen to make the test drop at Bikini Atoll. Later that year, it was transferred to the Smithsonian Institution and spent many years parked at air bases exposed to the weather and souvenir hunters, before its 1961 disassembly and storage at a Smithsonian facility in Suitland, Maryland.

In the 1980s, veterans groups engaged in a call for the Smithsonian to put the aircraft on display, leading to an acrimonious debate about exhibiting the aircraft without a proper historical context. The cockpit and nose section of the aircraft were exhibited at the National Air and Space Museum (NASM) on the National Mall, for the bombing's 50th anniversary in 1995, amid controversy. Since 2003, the entire restored B-29 has been on display at NASM's Steven F. Udvar-Hazy Center. The last survivor of its crew, Theodore Van Kirk, died on 28 July 2014 at the age of 93.

World War II

Early history
The Enola Gay (Model number B-29-45-MO, Serial number 44-86292, Victor number 82) was built by the Glenn L. Martin Company (later part of Lockheed Martin) at its bomber plant in Bellevue, Nebraska, located at Offutt Field, now Offutt Air Force Base. The bomber was one of the first fifteen B-29s built to the "Silverplate" specification— of 65 eventually completed during and after World War II—giving them the primary ability to function as nuclear "weapon delivery" aircraft. These modifications included an extensively modified bomb bay with pneumatic doors and British bomb attachment and release systems, reversible pitch propellers that gave more braking power on landing, improved engines with fuel injection and better cooling, and the removal of protective armor and gun turrets.

Enola Gay was personally selected by Colonel Paul W. Tibbets Jr., the commander of the 509th Composite Group, on 9 May 1945, while still on the assembly line. The aircraft was accepted by the United States Army Air Forces (USAAF) on 18 May 1945 and assigned to the 393d Bombardment Squadron, Heavy, 509th Composite Group. Crew B-9, commanded by Captain Robert A. Lewis, took delivery of the bomber and flew it from Omaha to the 509th base at Wendover Army Air Field, Utah, on 14 June 1945.

Thirteen days later, the aircraft left Wendover for Guam, where it received a bomb-bay modification, and flew to North Field, Tinian, on 6 July. It was initially given the Victor (squadron-assigned identification) number 12, but on 1 August, was given the circle R tail markings of the 6th Bombardment Group as a security measure and had its Victor number changed to 82 to avoid misidentification with actual 6th Bombardment Group aircraft.  During July, the bomber made eight practice or training flights and flew two missions, on 24 and 26 July, to drop pumpkin bombs on industrial targets at Kobe and Nagoya. Enola Gay was used on 31 July on a rehearsal flight for the actual mission.

Unlike the six uranium-235 target discs, which were later flown to Tinian on three separate aircraft arriving 28 and 29 July, the assembled projectile with the nine uranium-235 rings installed was shipped in a single lead-lined steel container weighing  that was locked to brackets welded to the deck of Captain Charles B. McVay III's quarters. Both the L-11 and projectile were dropped off at Tinian on 26 July 1945.

Hiroshima mission

On 5 August 1945, during preparation for the first atomic mission, Tibbets assumed command of the aircraft and named it after his mother, Enola Gay Tibbets, who, in turn, had been named for the heroine of a novel. When it came to selecting a name for the plane, Tibbets later recalled that: 

In the early morning hours, just prior to the 6 August mission, Tibbets had a young Army Air Forces maintenance man, Private Nelson Miller, paint the name just under the pilot's window. Regularly-assigned aircraft commander Robert Lewis was unhappy to be displaced by Tibbets for this important mission and became furious when he arrived at the aircraft on the morning of 6 August to see it painted with the now-famous nose art.

Hiroshima was the primary target of the first nuclear bombing mission on 6 August, with Kokura and Nagasaki as alternative targets. Enola Gay, piloted by Tibbets, took off from North Field, in the Northern Mariana Islands, about six hours' flight time from Japan, accompanied by two other B-29s, The Great Artiste, carrying instrumentation, and a then-nameless aircraft later called Necessary Evil, commanded by Captain George Marquardt, to take photographs. The director of the Manhattan Project, Major General Leslie R. Groves Jr., wanted the event recorded for posterity, so the takeoff was illuminated by floodlights. When he wanted to taxi, Tibbets leaned out the window to direct the bystanders out of the way. On request, he gave a friendly wave for the cameras.

Navy Captain William S. "Deak" Parsons of Project Alberta, who was in command of the mission, armed the bomb during the flight to minimize the risks during takeoff. His assistant, Second Lieutenant Morris R. Jeppson, removed the safety devices 30 minutes before reaching the target area.

Enola Gay traveled  before it felt the shock waves from the blast. Although buffeted by the shock, neither Enola Gay nor The Great Artiste was damaged.

The U-235 weapon was considered very inefficient, with only 1.7% of its fissile material reacting. Americans estimated that  of the city were destroyed. Japanese officials determined that 69% of Hiroshima's buildings were destroyed and another 6–7% damaged. Some 70,000–80,000 people, 30% of the city's population, were killed by the blast and resultant firestorm, and another 70,000 injured. Out of those killed, 20,000 were soldiers and 20,000 were Korean slave laborers.

Enola Gay returned safely to its base on Tinian to great fanfare, touching down at 2:58 pm, after 12 hours 13 minutes. The Great Artiste and Necessary Evil followed at short intervals. Several hundred people, including journalists and photographers, had gathered to watch the planes return. Tibbets was the first to disembark and was presented with the Distinguished Service Cross on the spot.

Nagasaki mission
The Hiroshima mission was followed by another atomic strike. Originally scheduled for 11 August, it was brought forward by two days to 9 August owing to a forecast of bad weather. This time, a nuclear bomb code-named "Fat Man" was carried by B-29 Bockscar, piloted by Major Charles W. Sweeney. Enola Gay, flown by Captain George Marquardt's Crew B-10, was the weather reconnaissance aircraft for Kokura, the primary target. Enola Gay reported clear skies over Kokura, but by the time Bockscar arrived, the city was obscured by smoke from fires from the conventional bombing of Yahata by 224 B-29s the day before. After three unsuccessful passes, Bockscar diverted to its secondary target, Nagasaki, where it dropped its bomb. In contrast to the Hiroshima mission, the Nagasaki mission has been described as tactically botched, although the mission did meet its objectives. The crew encountered a number of problems in execution and had very little fuel by the time they landed at the emergency backup landing site Yontan Airfield on Okinawa.

Crews

Hiroshima mission

Enola Gays crew on 6 August 1945 consisted of 12 men. The crew was:

 Colonel Paul W. Tibbets Jr. – pilot and aircraft commander
 Captain Robert A. Lewis – co-pilot; Enola Gay'''s regularly assigned aircraft commander*
 Major Thomas Ferebee – bombardier
 Captain Theodore "Dutch" Van Kirk – navigator
 Captain William S. "Deak" Parsons, USN – weaponeer and mission commander
 First Lieutenant Jacob Beser – radar countermeasures (also the only man to fly on both of the nuclear bombing aircraft.)
 Second Lieutenant Morris R. Jeppson – assistant weaponeer
 Staff Sergeant Robert "Bob" Caron – tail gunner*
 Staff Sergeant Wyatt E. Duzenbury – flight engineer*
 Sergeant Joe S. Stiborik – radar operator*
 Sergeant Robert H. Shumard – assistant flight engineer*
 Private First Class Richard H. Nelson – VHF radio operator*

Asterisks denote regular crewmen of the Enola Gay.

Of mission commander Parsons, it was said: "There is no one more responsible for getting this bomb out of the laboratory and into some form useful for combat operations than Captain Parsons, by his plain genius in the ordnance business."

Nagasaki mission
For the Nagasaki mission, Enola Gay was flown by Crew B-10, normally assigned to Up An' Atom:
Captain George W. Marquardt – aircraft commander 
Second Lieutenant James M. Anderson – co-pilot 
Second Lieutenant Russell Gackenbach – navigator 
Captain James W. Strudwick – bombardier 
Technical Sergeant James R. Corliss – flight engineer 
Sergeant Warren L. Coble – radio operator 
Sergeant Joseph M. DiJulio – radar operator 
Sergeant Melvin H. Bierman – tail gunner 
Sergeant Anthony D. Capua Jr. – assistant engineer/scanner

Subsequent history

On 6 November 1945, Lewis flew the Enola Gay back to the United States, arriving at the 509th's new base at Roswell Army Air Field, New Mexico, on 8 November. On 29 April 1946, Enola Gay left Roswell as part of the Operation Crossroads nuclear weapons tests in the Pacific. It flew to Kwajalein Atoll on 1 May. It was not chosen to make the test drop at Bikini Atoll and left Kwajalein on 1 July, the date of the test, reaching Fairfield-Suisun Army Air Field, California, the next day.

The decision was made to preserve the Enola Gay, and on 24 July 1946, the aircraft was flown to Davis–Monthan Air Force Base, Tucson, Arizona, in preparation for storage. On 30 August 1946, the title to the aircraft was transferred to the Smithsonian Institution and the Enola Gay was removed from the USAAF inventory. From 1946 to 1961, the Enola Gay was put into temporary storage at a number of locations. It was at Davis-Monthan from 1 September 1946 until 3 July 1949, when it was flown to Orchard Place Air Field, Park Ridge, Illinois, by Tibbets for acceptance by the Smithsonian. It was moved to Pyote Air Force Base, Texas, on 12 January 1952, and then to Andrews Air Force Base, Maryland, on 2 December 1953, because the Smithsonian had no storage space for the aircraft.

It was hoped that the Air Force would guard the plane, but, lacking hangar space, it was left outdoors on a remote part of the air base, exposed to the elements. Souvenir hunters broke in and removed parts. Insects and birds then gained access to the aircraft. Paul E. Garber of the Smithsonian Institution became concerned about the Enola Gays condition, and on 10 August 1960, Smithsonian staff began dismantling the aircraft. The components were transported to the Smithsonian storage facility at Suitland, Maryland, on 21 July 1961.Enola Gay remained at Suitland for many years. By the early 1980s, two veterans of the 509th, Don Rehl and his former navigator in the 509th, Frank B. Stewart, began lobbying for the aircraft to be restored and put on display. They enlisted Tibbets and Senator Barry Goldwater in their campaign. In 1983, Walter J. Boyne, a former B-52 pilot with the Strategic Air Command, became director of the National Air and Space Museum, and he made the Enola Gays restoration a priority. Looking at the aircraft, Tibbets recalled, was a "sad meeting. [My] fond memories, and I don't mean the dropping of the bomb, were the numerous occasions I flew the airplane ... I pushed it very, very hard and it never failed me ... It was probably the most beautiful piece of machinery that any pilot ever flew."

 Restoration 
Restoration of the bomber began on 5 December 1984, at the Paul E. Garber Preservation, Restoration, and Storage Facility in Suitland-Silver Hill, Maryland. The propellers that were used on the bombing mission were later shipped to Texas A&M University. Two engines were rebuilt at Garber and two at San Diego Air & Space Museum. Some parts and instruments had been removed and could not be located. Replacements were found or fabricated, and marked so that future curators could distinguish them from the original components.

Exhibition controversyEnola Gay became the center of a controversy at the Smithsonian Institution when the museum planned to put its fuselage on public display in 1995 as part of an exhibit commemorating the 50th anniversary of the atomic bombing of Hiroshima. The exhibit, The Crossroads: The End of World War II, the Atomic Bomb and the Cold War, was drafted by the Smithsonian's National Air and Space Museum staff, and arranged around the restored Enola Gay.

Critics of the planned exhibit, especially those of the American Legion and the Air Force Association, charged that the exhibit focused too much attention on the Japanese casualties inflicted by the nuclear bomb, rather than on the motives for the bombing or the discussion of the bomb's role in ending the conflict with Japan. The exhibit brought to national attention many long-standing academic and political issues related to retrospective views of the bombings. After attempts to revise the exhibit to meet the satisfaction of competing interest groups, the exhibit was canceled on 30 January 1995. Martin O. Harwit, Director of the National Air and Space Museum, was compelled to resign over the controversy. He later reflected that

The forward fuselage went on display on 28 June 1995. On 2 July 1995, three people were arrested for throwing ash and human blood on the aircraft's fuselage, following an earlier incident in which a protester had thrown red paint over the gallery's carpeting. The exhibition closed on 18 May 1998 and the fuselage was returned to the Garber Facility for final restoration.

Complete restoration and display

Restoration work began in 1984, and eventually required 300,000 staff hours. While the fuselage was on display, from 1995 to 1998, work continued on the remaining unrestored components. The aircraft was shipped in pieces to the National Air and Space Museum's Steven F. Udvar-Hazy Center in Chantilly, Virginia from March–June 2003, with the fuselage and wings reunited for the first time since 1960 on 10 April 2003 and assembly completed on 8 August 2003. The aircraft has been on display at the Udvar-Hazy Center since the museum annex opened on 15 December 2003. As a result of the earlier controversy, the signage around the aircraft provided only the same succinct technical data as is provided for other aircraft in the museum, without discussion of the controversial issues. It read:

The display of the Enola Gay without reference to the historical context of World War II, the Cold War, or the development and deployment of nuclear weapons aroused controversy. A petition from a group calling themselves the Committee for a National Discussion of Nuclear History and Current Policy bemoaned the display of Enola Gay'' as a technological achievement, which it described as an "extraordinary callousness toward the victims, indifference to the deep divisions among American citizens about the propriety of these actions, and disregard for the feelings of most of the world's peoples". It attracted signatures from notable figures including historian Gar Alperovitz, social critic Noam Chomsky, whistle blower Daniel Ellsberg, physicist Joseph Rotblat, writer Kurt Vonnegut, producer Norman Lear, actor Martin Sheen and filmmaker Oliver Stone.

References

Notes

Citations

Bibliography

Further reading

External links

 The Smithsonian's site on Enola Gay includes links to crew lists and other details 
 Eyewitnesses to Hiroshima, Time magazine, 1 August 2005
 "Inside the Enola Gay", Air & Space, 18 May 2010

Atomic bombings of Hiroshima and Nagasaki
Individual aircraft of World War II
Individual aircraft in the collection of the Smithsonian Institution
Boeing B-29 Superfortress